Little Sandusky is an unincorporated community in Wyandot County, in the U.S. state of Ohio.

History
Little Sandusky was laid out in 1830 by Dr. Stephen Fowler, John Wilson, and Walter Woolsey. The community took its name from the nearby Little Sandusky River. A post office called Little Sandusky was established in 1825, and remained in operation until 1903.

References

Unincorporated communities in Wyandot County, Ohio
Unincorporated communities in Ohio
1830 establishments in Ohio